Guru Thakur is an Indian poet, lyricist, scriptwriter, actor and playwright from Mumbai (Maharashtra), known for his contributions in Marathi and Hindi film industry.

Early life
Born in Mumbai, Maharashtra, Guru started his career at the age of 19 as a political cartoonist at Marathi weekly Marmik.

Career as Scriptwriter 
Guru Thakur has written dialogues/scripts for movies, Aga bai Arrecha, Natarang, Bhikari and Narbachi Wadi.

Awards and nominations 
Guru Thakur has won many awards and honours including:
 2022 शांताबाई शेळके स्मृती पुरस्कार  2022
 2022 Aarti Prabhu award 2022
 2021 Planet Marathi Filmfare award 2021 - Best Lyrics for the song 'Kona Mage Bhirbhirta' from the movie Preetam
 2013 'Ma. Ta. Sanman Award' as Best Lyricist for the song 'Bagh Ughadun Daar' from the movie Bharatiya.
 2010 'BIG FM' BIG Lyricist Award for Song Khel Mandla form Natarang
 2010 'Zee Gaurav Award' as Best Lyricist for the song 'Khel Mandala' from the Movie Natarang.
 2010 'Ma. Ta. Sanman Award' as Best Lyricist for the song 'Khel Mandala' from the movie Natarang.
 2010 'Chitrapati V Shantaram Award' as Best Lyricist for the song 'Khel Mandala' from the movie Natarang.
 2010 Saraswat Chaitanya Gaurav Puraskar.
 2010 Nomination at 'Zee Gaurav Awards' for Best Lyricist for the song 'He Raje Ji Ra Ji' from the movie Me Shivajiraje Bhosale Boltoy.
 2009 'Indradhanu Yuvonmesh Puraskar' for Song Witting.
 2009 Nomination at 46th 'Maharashtra Rajya Chitrapat Puraskar' for Best Dialogue for the movie Marmabandh.

Work List

Movies

Aga Bai Arrecha (2004)
Natrang (2010)
Kshanbhar Vishranti (2010)
Chandramukhi (2022)
Maharashtra Shahir (2023)

References

External links
 Guru Thakur's blog
 Interview on website Maayboli

Marathi people
Marathi-language poets
Marathi-language writers
Writers from Mumbai
Living people
Indian lyricists
Poets from Maharashtra
21st-century Indian poets
Marathi screenwriters
21st-century Indian dramatists and playwrights
Year of birth missing (living people)
21st-century Indian screenwriters